Aleksandria  is a village in the administrative district of Gmina Konopiska, within Częstochowa County, Silesian Voivodeship, in southern Poland.

The village has a population of 2,131.

History
The village was founded in honor of Russian Emperor Alexander II. Previously, this area was covered with forest. In Alexandria there is a Church of Maximilian Kolbe built in 1991. There is also the house of the Missionaries of St. Anthony Mary Claret.

References

Villages in Częstochowa County